Philip Alexander Scrubb (born November 27, 1992) is a Canadian–British professional basketball player for Monbus Obradoiro of the Liga ACB. He is a 6'4½" (1.94 m) tall guard. During his college basketball career, he won five CIS championships with the Carleton University Ravens, before embarking on a professional career. Scrubb is considered one of the greatest players in CIS basketball history.

High school career
Scrubb played high school basketball at Vancouver College, under the basketball coach Bill Disbrow.

College career
Scrubb's career is perhaps the most accomplished in the history of Canadian Interuniversity Sport basketball. In 2010, Scrubb joined a powerhouse Carleton Ravens team at Carleton University that had won the Canadian men’s university basketball championship in six of the previous eight years. He averaged 13.1 points per game, and helped the Ravens to a perfect 22-0 record, and their seventh national championship. Scrubb was named an OUA East Second Team All-Star, and earned the Dr. Peter Mullins Trophy as CIS Rookie of the Year.

In his second season at Carleton, Scrubb led the Ravens to another 22-0 season, and earned the Mike Moser Memorial Trophy as the Outstanding Player in the CIS. He also was awarded the Jack Donohue Trophy as MVP of the CIS Championship Tournament, as the Ravens took the national title again.

Scrubb won his second Moser Trophy the following year, and took the award again after the 2013–14 season. He is the only three-time recipient of the award in CIS history. In his final season at Carleton, Scrubb led the Ravens to their fifth consecutive national title, and earned his second Donohue Trophy as playoff MVP. He also was selected First Team All-Canadian for the fourth consecutive year. During his five years at Carleton, the Ravens had a won-lost record of 102-3. He and his brother Thomas dominated CIS basketball during their time with the Ravens.

College statistics

|-
| style="text-align:left;"| 2010–11
| style="text-align:left;"| Carleton
| 22 || 20 || 25.1 || 42.8 || 40.5 || 86.4 || 3.1 || 2.8 || 1.1 || 0.3 || 13.1
|-
| style="text-align:left;"| 2011–12
| style="text-align:left;"| Carleton
| 22 || 21 || 23.5 || 55.7 || 57.0 || 81.9 || 2.5 || 3.3 || 1.2 || 0.2 || 16.2
|-
| style="text-align:left;"| 2012–13
| style="text-align:left;"| Carleton
| 20 || 19 || 29.0 || 45.9 || 42.6 || 86.0 || 3.3 || 3.5 || 1.6 || 0.4 || 18.6
|-
| style="text-align:left;"| 2013–14
| style="text-align:left;"| Carleton
| 22 || 20 || 27.5 || 49.2 || 47.0 || 87.4 || 3.2 || 4.9 || 0.5 || 0.3 || 18.6
|-
| style="text-align:left;"| 2014–15
| style="text-align:left;"| Carleton
| 19 || 18 || 25.3 || 48.3 || 48.7 || 90.0 || 3.3 || 4.5 || 1.3 || 0.1 || 16.6
|- class="sortbottom"
| style="text-align:center;" colspan=2| Career
| 105 || 98 || 26.0 || 48.4 || 46.8 || 86.4 || 3.1 || 3.8 || 1.1 || 0.2 || 16.6

Professional career
After finishing the season at Carleton, Scrubb signed with Entersport, a leading professional basketball agency. In July 2015, Scrubb played with the NBA Summer League teams of the Memphis Grizzlies and the Toronto Raptors. In August 2015, Scrubb began his professional career with the Greek League club AEK Athens, after signing a two-year contract with them. In the winter of 2016, he moved to Germany, after he was loaned by AEK to the German Bundesliga club, the Skyliners Frankfurt. On May 1, 2016, he captured the FIBA Europe Cup title with the Skyliners, tallying six points, three rebounds and two assists in the championship game.

The Frankfurt team exercised an option in June 2016, to keep Scrubb for the 2016–17 season. However, he missed the beginning of the season, due to problems with his knee; and in December 2016, the Skyliners announced that Scrubb had to undergo surgery to repair the knee injury, after the failure of conservative treatment, and that he would be out for between six and nine months. He returned to the Frankfurt team for the 2017–18 season. In April 2018, Scrubb won the BBL Best Offensive Player award. Scrubb was the Basketball Bundesliga Top Scorer as well, as he averaged 18.3 points per game on his way to leading Frankfurt to the playoffs as the eighth-seed.

On July 18, 2018, Scrubb signed a one-year deal with Zenit Saint Petersburg of the VTB United League. On July 17, 2019, Scrubb signed a one-year deal with Spanish club Movistar Estudiantes. Scrubb averaged 9.4 points per game. On July 23, 2020, he signed with Limoges CSP of the LNB Pro A.

On May 14, 2021, Scrubb signed with the Niagara River Lions of the Canadian Elite Basketball League.

On August 17, 2021, Scrubb signed with the Russian team BC Avtodor of the VTB United League. he averaged 11.9 points, 2.0 rebounds and 3.8 assists per game. He left the team after the 2022 Russian invasion of Ukraine.

On March 9, 2022, Scrubb signed with Monbus Obradoiro of the Liga ACB.

National team career 
Scrubb represented Canada's national teams on the international stage several times: He helped Canada’s Under-18 junior national team win a bronze medal at the 2010 FIBA Americas Under-18 Championship, and also played for Team Canada Under-19 at the 2011 FIBA Under-19 World Cup. The same year, he made Canada’s roster for the 2011 Pan American Games. Scrubb also played at the 2013 World University Games,

Canadian senior national team
In 2015, Scrubb helped the senior men's Canadian national basketball team win the Marchand Cup, and capture bronze at the 2015 FIBA Americas Championship. He also played for senior Team Canada at the 2016 FIBA World Olympic Qualifying Tournament in Manila.

Personal
Scrubb's brother, Thomas, is also a professional basketball player.

References

External links
 Philip Scrubb Canadian Interuniversity Profile
 Philip Scrubb at draftexpress.com
 Philip Scrubb at eurobasket.com
 Philip Scrubb at esake.gr
 Philip Scrubb at euroleague.net
 Philip Scrubb at fiba.com

1992 births
Living people
2019 FIBA Basketball World Cup players
AEK B.C. players
Basketball players at the 2011 Pan American Games
Basketball people from British Columbia
BC Zenit Saint Petersburg players
British men's basketball players
Canadian expatriate basketball people in France
Canadian expatriate basketball people in Germany
Canadian expatriate basketball people in Greece
Canadian expatriate basketball people in Russia
Canadian expatriate basketball people in Spain
Canadian men's basketball players
Canadian people of British descent
Carleton Ravens basketball players
CB Estudiantes players
Greek Basket League players
Liga ACB players
Niagara River Lions players
Obradoiro CAB players
Pan American Games competitors for Canada
Point guards
Shooting guards
Skyliners Frankfurt players